Arslanlı is a village in the Oğuzeli District, Gaziantep Province, Turkey. The village is inhabited by Turkmens from various tribes and Abdals of the Kurular tribe.

References

Villages in Oğuzeli District